The National Mass Transportation Assistance Act of 1974 is a United States federal law that extended the Urban Mass Transportation Act to cover operating costs as well as construction costs. This act was the culmination of a major lobbying effort by the transit industry and urban interests to secure federal operating assistance for transit.

See also
 Urban Mass Transportation Act of 1964
 Urban Mass Transportation Act of 1970

References
Urban Transportation Planning In the United States: An Historical Overview: Fifth Edition
Urban Transportation Planning In the United States: An Historical Overview: Fifth Edition

External links
 National Mass Transportation Assistance Act ( details) as enacted in the US Statutes at Large

1974 in law
93rd United States Congress
United States federal transportation legislation
United States railroad regulation
1974 in rail transport